Bradley Green is a village in the Wychavon district of Worcestershire, England. It is located just south of the town of Redditch and south of Feckenham, Astwood Bank, Callow Hill and Inkberrow. It is also near the border with the Redditch district.

References

Villages in Worcestershire
Wychavon